In French cuisine, the mother sauces, also known as  in French, are a group of sauces upon which many other sauces"daughter sauces" or are based. Different sets and classifications of mother sauces have been proposed since at least the early 19th century.

The most common list of mother sauces in current use is attributed to chef Auguste Escoffier and based on his seminal cookery book Le guide culinaire:

 Béchamel sauce: White sauce, based on milk thickened with a white roux.
 Espagnole sauce: Brown sauce based on a brown stock reduction, and thickened with a brown roux. Ingredients typically include roasted bones, bacon, and tomato (puréed or fresh).
 Tomato sauce (sometimes  or ): As well as tomatoes, ingredients typically include carrots, onion, garlic, butter, and flour, plus pork belly and veal broth.
 Velouté sauce: Light coloured sauce, made by reducing clear stock (made from un-roasted bones) and thickened with a white roux.  is French for "velvety".
 Hollandaise sauce: Warm emulsion of egg yolk, melted butter, and lemon juice or vinegar.

The original French editions of Le guide culinaire did not include Hollandaise as a grande sauce, but separately described mayonnaise—a cold emulsion of egg yolk with oil and vinegar—as a mother sauce for cold sauces; this was not included in the English edition.

History
The concept of mother sauces predated Escoffier's classification by at least 50 years; in 1844, the French magazine Revue de Paris reported: "Oui ne savez-vous pas que la grande espagnole est une sauce-mère, dont toutes les autres préparations, telles que réductions, fonds de cuisson, jus, veloutés, essences, coulis, ne sont, à proprement parler, que des dérivés?" ("Don’t you know that the grand sauce Espagnole is a mother sauce, of which all the other preparations, such as reductions, stocks, jus, veloutés, essences, and coulis, are, strictly speaking, only derivatives?")

Different classifications of French sauces into mother and daughter sauces have been proposed by different chefs, varying in number and selection.

Classification by Marie Antoine Carême (1833)
In 1833, Marie Antoine Carême published a classification of French sauces in his reference cookbook L’art de la cuisine française au XIXe siècle ("The Art of French Cuisine in the 19th Century"). Instead of mother sauces, he called them Grandes et Petites sauces ("great and small sauces").

In this cookbook, Carême defined a sauce classification and listed four grandes sauces:

 Espagnole
 Velouté
 Allemande
 Béchamel

Carême classified the following as petites sauces:

 Poivrade
 Suprême
 Tomate
 Hollandaise
 Mayonnaise

Classification by Jules Gouffé (1867)
In 1867, the French chef and pâtissier Jules Gouffé published Le livre de cuisine comprenant la grande cuisine et la cuisine de ménage (The Cookbook Including Grand And Domestic Cooking).

In this book, Gouffé listed twelve mother sauces. (He used both the terms grandes sauces and sauce mères).

 Espagnole Grasse (Fattier Espagnole)
 Espagnole Maigre (Leaner Espagnole)
 Velouté Gras (Fattier Velouté)
 Velouté Maigre (Leaner Velouté)
 Allemande (Velouté thickened with eggs)
 Béchamel à l’ancienne (Old Fashioned Béchamel)
 Béchamel de volaille (Poultry Béchamel)
 Béchamel maigre (Leaner Béchamel)
 Poivrade brune (Brown Poivrade)
 Poivrade Blanche (White Poivrade)
 Poivrade Maigre (Leaner Poivrade)
 Marinade

Classification by Auguste Escoffier (1903)
The pioneering chef Auguste Escoffier is credited with establishing the importance of Espagnole, Velouté, Béchamel and Tomate, as well as Hollandaise and Mayonnaise. His book Le guide culinaire was published in 1903. The 1912 edition lists the "Grandes Sauces de base" as:

Espagnole
Velouté
Béchamel
Tomate

Escoffier listed Hollandaise sauce as a daughter sauce in Le guide culinaire. Mayonnaise was placed in the chapter on cold sauces, described as a mother sauce for cold sauces, and compared to Espagnole and Velouté.

The 1907 English edition of Le guide culinaire, A Guide to Modern Cookery, listed five "basic sauces", including Hollandaise alongside the original four. The English edition did not describe mayonnaise as a mother sauce.

Daughter sauces 
Many sauces, often referred to as daughter sauces, can be derived from mother sauces.

Béchamel sauce

Béchamel is a milk-based sauce, thickened with a white roux and typically flavoured with onion, nutmeg, or thyme.

Derivations of béchamel
Crème
Mornay
Soubise
Ecossaise
Nantua

Espagnole sauce

Espagnole is a strong-flavoured brown sauce, made from a dark brown roux and brown stock—usually beef or veal stock—and tomatoes or tomato paste.

Derivations of espagnole
 Demi-glace
 Poivrade
 Grand veneur
 Bigarade

Velouté sauce

Velouté is light in colour, made by reducing clear stock (made from un-roasted bones), usually veal, chicken or fish stock, thickened with a white or blond roux. Velouté is the French word for "velvety".

Derivations of velouté
 Allemande
 Poulette
 Cardinal
 Poultry velouté
 Suprême
 Albuféra
 Fish velouté
 Bercy
 Normande

Tomato sauce

The sauce tomate described by Escoffier is a tomato sauce made with fatty salted pork breast, a mirepoix of carrots, onions and thyme, and white stock.

Derivations of tomato 
 Bolognese
 Portugaise
 Milanaise

Hollandaise sauce

Hollandaise is a warm emulsion based on egg yolk and clarified butter, flavoured with lemon juice or vinegar.

Derivations of hollandaise 
 Béarnaise
 Foyot
 Paloise
 Choron
 Bavaroise sauce 
 Crème fleurette 
 Maltese sauce 
 Noisette sauce

Mayonnaise

Mayonnaise is an emulsion of egg yolk and oil, served cold and flavoured with lemon juice, vinegar, and seasoning.

Derivations of mayonnaise
 Rémoulade
 Tartar sauce
 Gribiche
 Samourai

See also

 List of sauces

References

External links
 Auguste Escoffier School of Culinary Arts: An Introduction to the 5 French Mother Sauces

French cuisine
French sauces
Mother sauces